Witaliý Alikperow  is a Turkmenistani football midfielder who played for Turkmenistan in the 2004 Asian Cup. He also played for Merw, Nisa Asgabat, Garagum Türkmenabat, Nebitçi Balkanabat, Nasaf Qarshi and Bunyodkor.

Career statistics

Club

International

Statistics accurate as of match played 3 August 2008

References

External links

1978 births
Living people
Turkmenistan footballers
Turkmenistan expatriate footballers
Turkmenistan international footballers
Turkmenistan people of Russian descent
Turkmenistan people of Azerbaijani descent
Association football midfielders
Expatriate footballers in Uzbekistan
Turkmenistan expatriate sportspeople in Uzbekistan